The  EMUs were manufactured in 1936-1937 in 3 batches and operated by Japanese Government Railways (JGR, later JNR) for use on the Hanwa Line, and later used on the San'yō Main Line, JR Kobe Line, JR Kyoto Line in the Kansai region and the Iida Line in Nagano Prefecture, Japan. The trains were developed from the 42 series EMUs.

The 52 series EMUs were retired between 1976 and 1983.

Preserved examples

 KuMoHa 52001: Suita Depot, Osaka
 KuMoHa 52004: (built in 1937 by Kawasaki Sharyo), SCMaglev and Railway Park, Nagoya.

References

Electric multiple units of Japan
Train-related introductions in 1936
1500 V DC multiple units of Japan
Nippon Sharyo multiple units
Kawasaki multiple units